Mark Treloar Best (born 29 November 1994) is an English former first-class cricketer.

Best was born at Nuneaton in November 1994. He was educated at Bablake School, before going up to Loughborough University. While studying at Loughborough, he made four appearances in first-class cricket for Loughborough MCCU, making two appearances each in 2014 and 2015. He scored 120 runs in his four matches, at an average of 20.00 and with a high score of 50 against Sussex in 2014. His brother, Paul, played first-class cricket at county level.

References

External links

1994 births
Living people
People from Nuneaton
People educated at Bablake School
Alumni of Loughborough University
English cricketers
Loughborough MCCU cricketers